The 1899 Northern Illinois State Normal football team represented Northern Illinois State Normal College as an independent in the 1899 college football season. 1899 was the first year that the school fielded a football team. They were led by head coach John A. H. Keith. The team finished the season with a 1–0–2 record.

Schedule

References

Northern Illinois State
Northern Illinois Huskies football seasons
College football undefeated seasons
Northern Illinois State Normal football